Aviafa is an old and uncommon Russian female first name.

The diminutives of "Aviafa" are Ava and Afa.

References

Notes

Sources
Н. А. Петровский (N. A. Petrovsky). "Словарь русских личных имён" (Dictionary of Russian First Names). ООО Издательство "АСТ". Москва, 2005. 

